Dorood or Dorud or Dow Rud may refer to:
 Deh Rud, Fars
 Dorud, Kurdistan
 Dorood (city), Lorestan, Iran
 Dorud County, Lorestan, Iran
 Dorud, West Azerbaijan
 Dorud, alternate name of Dorudgaran
 Oil field offshore in Kharg Island

See also
 Darrud